Nuq may refer to:

 Nuq, Bajestan, Razavi Khorasan Province, Iran, a village
 Nuq, Roshtkhar,  Razavi Khorasan Province, a village
 Nuq District, Kerman Province, Iran
 IATA airport code for Moffett Federal Airfield, California

See also
 Nuuk, the capital of Greenland
 Nuk (disambiguation)
 Nuck (disambiguation)
 Nuc (disambiguation)